Peter Koprivnikar (born 2 July 1976) is a Slovenian archer. He competed at the 1996 Summer Olympics and the 2000 Summer Olympics.

References

External links
 

1976 births
Living people
Slovenian male archers
Olympic archers of Slovenia
Archers at the 1996 Summer Olympics
Archers at the 2000 Summer Olympics
Sportspeople from Maribor